Statistics of Empress's Cup in the 1985 season.

Overview
It was contested by 16 teams, and Shimizudaihachi SC won the championship.

Results

1st Round
Shimizudaihachi SC 16-0 Yonago Cosmos
Miyagi Hirose High School 0-2 Chigasaki Fevers
Kobe FC 3-0 Kumamoto Akita
Nagoya LFC 0-5 FC Jinnan
Yomiuri SC Beleza 14-0 Ladies Saijo
Hyogo University of Teacher Education 3-0 Uwajima Minami High School
Yonan SC 0-0 (pen 3-5) Shizuoka Koki SC
Molten Habatake 0-7 Takatsuki FC

Quarterfinals
Shimizudaihachi SC 6-0 Chigasaki Fevers
Kobe FC 1-0 FC Jinnan
Yomiuri SC Beleza 3-0 Hyogo University of Teacher Education
Shizuoka Koki SC 0-3 Takatsuki FC

Semifinals
Shimizudaihachi SC 2-0 Kobe FC
Yomiuri SC Beleza 0-1 Takatsuki FC

Final
Shimizudaihachi SC 5-1 Takatsuki FC
Shimizudaihachi SC won the championship.

References

Empress's Cup
1985 in Japanese women's football